Veer Kunwar Singh Stadium is a multi-purpose stadium located in Arrah, Bihar. The stadium has capacity of 10,000 spectators. The stadium is a venue for football tournaments, fairs & exhibition. It is used mostly for association football matches and the stadium is named after the Indian leader Babu Veer Kunwar Singh.

References

Year of establishment missing
Sports venues in Bihar
Arrah